The AHS Krab (Polish for crab) is a 155 mm NATO-compatible self-propelled tracked gun-howitzer designed in Poland by Huta Stalowa Wola (HSW), by combining the South Korean K9 Thunder chassis with a British BAE Systems AS-90M Braveheart turret with French Nexter Systems 52-calibre long gun and Polish WB Electronics' Topaz artillery fire control system. "AHS" is not a part of the name, but Polish abbreviation of armatohaubica samobieżna - gun-howitzer, self-propelled.

The 2011 version used a Nexter Systems barrel and Polish UPG-NG chassis. The 2016 production batch utilized the  Hanwha Defense K9 chassis with KMW+Nexter Defense Systems long gun, Rheinmetall barrel and STX Engine-MTU Friedrichshafen engine.  full-rate production of 120 Krabs for the Polish Army has started with deliveries to be completed by 2024. , Huta Stalowa Wola started using barrels of their own manufacture in successive production batches.

History 
The cannon was developed within the "Regina" research framework. The program's goal was to create a  calibre long-range artillery piece for the Polish Army that would serve as a division-level asset. It was decided, that instead of buying a licence for a complete vehicle, only a licence for a modern L/52 gun and turret would be bought, and they would be mounted on domestically developed chassis.

In 1997 a competition for an artillery component, a complete turret with a gun, was announced. The British AS-90M won the competition, the other contestant was the PzH-2000. In 1999 its technology was transferred to Huta Stalowa Wola factory. The UPG-NG chassis was developed in Poland by OBRUM in Gliwice, from an SPG-1M chassis, itself developed from a Soviet MT-S tractor, using parts combined with the PT-91 Twardy tank. The first prototype was completed in 2001, the second the following year. 

The first two prototypes of the howitzer are fitted with turret systems supplied by BAE Systems. It was planned to complete the first squadron in 2008, but the program was delayed due to financial reasons, and not until 2008 did the Polish Army order the introductory batch of the squadron module, completed in 2012. It covers eight guns (six new-built and two upgraded prototype vehicles), command vehicles (on a much modernized MTLB chassis), as well as ammunition and repair vehicles for the ordnance and electronics.

In the introductory and series products, Nexter guns replaced the original British pieces. The trial firing of another gun supplied by the manufacturer continued every month through the end of the year, the third gun was tested on 10 August under the supervision of representatives of the Armament Inspectorate and the Head Office of the Missile and Artillery Force of the Air Forces, at the Dynamic Trial Center of the WITU, the Military Technical Institute of Armament, in Stalowa Wola.

The first firing of the third complete Krab, which also received new elements of onboard electronics developed by WB Electronics, occurred in July 2011. The concentration of fire was among the requirements tested. As of 2012, two prototypes and eight initial units, two artillery batteries each with four guns, had been built by Huta Stalowa Wola. In 2012–2013 eight new examples were used for tests conducted by the Polish Army as a part of a "Regina" battery command module.

In December 2014, the Polish Ministry of Defence announced the deal worth US$320M with Korean Samsung Techwin (now Hanwha Techwin) to purchase 120 K9 Thunder chassis, with the first 24 to be delivered in 2017 and 96 to be built under licence in Poland in 2018–2022. Poland also evaluated the Turkish-built T-155 Firtina chassis of the same origin. The original Polish OBRUM's UPG-NG chassis built by BUMAR equipped with an S-12U engine and other elements (like road wheels) from the PT-91 Twardy used in eight initial production howitzers was abandoned due to structural cracks and ceased production of S-12U engines.

The first K9 chassis was shipped to Poland for testing and integration in June 2015. The prototype was rolled out in August 2015. It went through type acceptance testing in October 2015. The test ended successfully in April 2016, allowing series production. In April 2016, the Ministry of National Defence and the manufacturer concluded the research and development phase. In April 2016, during the Polish prime minister's visit to Stalowa Wola, the first two serial examples were handed over to Polish Army. 

They joined eight initial production examples at the Artillery Training Center in Toruń, and were used to develop operational standards for combat units. During the handover ceremony in November 2016, nine Krabs were accepted in the presence of the Polish Minister of National Defence, while seven more were in the acceptance testing phase. Eight original turrets on UPG chassis are scheduled to be upgraded to the K9 chassis after the first batch of 16 guns is delivered by the end of 2016. The deal for the next 96 units was signed in December 2016, raising total order to 120 Krabs for five regiments.

Each of the planned five regiments of Krabs will be equipped with 24 howitzers. The first unit to receive 24 Krabs by 2017 will be 11th Masurian Artillery Regiment in Węgorzewo. The development program of advanced, smart 155 mm ammunition was expected to conclude in 2017.

In late May 2022, the Polish government donated 18 Krabs to Ukraine to help the Ukrainian military defend the nation against the 2022 Russian invasion of Ukraine. The two governments signed a contract under which Poland will sell Ukraine an additional 60 Krabs, in a deal worth 3 billion złotys (US$700 million). With the deal, Ukraine became the first export customer for Polish Krabs. The agreement was the largest defence contract that Poland had made in the previous 20 years. In October 2022, Ukraine's Ministry of Defence Oleksii Reznikov revealed, that Poland had already donated three battalions of Krabs (i.e. 54 pieces with support vehicles), and another three were ordered.

Operators 

  Polish Land Forces – 62 in stock. 80 delivered of a total of 122 ordered, however 18 were donated to Ukraine leaving Poland with 62. On 2022-09-05 another 48 were ordered.
  Ukrainian Ground Forces – 18 units were given by Poland from Polish Army stock, another 54 on order. As of 14 January 2023, 7 units were destroyed and 2 were damaged.

Operational history 
Ukraine reports that it has used the weapon during fighting near Sievierodonetsk.

The AHS Krab was used during the 2022 Ukrainian eastern counteroffensive in the Kharkiv Oblast.

In Autumn 2022 it was revealed, that Ukraine used the Krab with Excalibur precision ammunition, obtaining range above 50 km.

See also 
 2S35 Koalitsiya-SV
 AS-90
 K-9 Thunder
 M109
 PLZ-05
 PzH 2000
 SSPH Primus
 T-155 Fırtına
 Type 99

Notes

References 

Self-propelled howitzers of Poland
Science and technology in Poland
155 mm artillery
Tracked self-propelled howitzers
Military vehicles introduced in the 2000s